William Stuart Adamson (11 April 1958 –  16 December 2001) was a Scottish rock guitarist and singer. Adamson began his career in the late 1970s as a founding member and performer with the punk rock band Skids. After leaving Skids in 1981, he formed Big Country and was the band's lead singer and guitarist. The group's commercial heyday was in the 1980s. In the 1990s, he was a member of the alternative country band The Raphaels. In the late 1970s the British music journalist John Peel referred to his musical virtuosity as a guitarist as "a new Jimi Hendrix".

Early life and career
Adamson was born in the city of Manchester, England, to Scottish parents Anne (née Muir) and William Adamson. When he was four, his family relocated to the small mining village of Crossgates, about a mile east of Dunfermline in Fife. Adamson's father, a fishing industry executive who travelled the world, encouraged his son to read literature, and both parents shared an interest in folk music. Adamson received his formal education at Beath High School.

Adamson entered rock music during the British punk rock movement of the mid-1970s, forming a Dunfermline band called Tattoo in 1976 after seeing The Damned at a gig across the Firth of Forth in the capital city of Edinburgh. Besides Adamson, Tattoo included his friend William Simpson, who would also play bass guitar in their next band, Skids, which began performing in the local area and in Edinburgh.

Skids
Adamson founded Skids in 1977 when he was 18. He and Simpson first recruited drummer Thomas Kellichan and performed as a trio until meeting the 16-year-old Richard Jobson., who became the act's lead singer/frontman, Adamson and Jobson being the principal songwriters for the act.

Skids' biggest success was the single "Into the Valley", released in 1979, which reached #10 in the UK Singles Chart. The band had four chart singles in the United Kingdom that year. Adamson was involved with the band's first three long-players, before quitting the act in 1981 after disagreements with Jobson, whose personality was increasingly dominating the band's output. Jobson later said of Adamson: "This was a guy who had a mortgage, a wife, and a family when we were all trying to live some mythic punk lifestyle. He seemed level-headed, grounded."

Big Country
Adamson found international fame with Big Country, a band formed with friend and fellow guitarist Bruce Watson, then employed as a submarine cleaner at Rosyth naval base, and a rhythm section of studio musicians Mark Brzezicki and Tony Butler, found with the help of his label.

Big Country's first hit, 1983's "Fields of Fire", reached the UK's Top 10, and was rapidly followed by the album The Crossing. The album was a big hit in North America (Canada.#4, United States #18) powered by the single "In a Big Country", which was performed on Saturday Night Live and the Grammy Awards. The video for "In a Big Country" received frequent airplay on MTV and featured the band riding all terrain vehicles in the countryside.

Their second album Steeltown appeared in October 1984.  The band's third album The Seer (1986) featured Kate Bush on the title track. The first two albums were produced by Steve Lillywhite. The band continued to record studio albums and tour until 2000. Adamson supplied much of the distinctive guitar work, as well as being the lead singer and main songwriter (both music and lyrics). The band's lineup rarely underwent changes, the exception being the departure of drummer Mark Brzezicki who left in the summer of 1989 and was replaced by Pat Ahern. Brzezicki re-joined the band in 1993.

Personal life
Adamson was married twice. He had two children with his first wife Sandra in 1982 and 1985. His son Callum Adamson is the guitarist of the band Ahab, and his daughter Kirsten has a solo musical career. In 1996, Adamson split with Sandra and moved to Nashville, US. There he married his second wife in 1999, a hairdresser named Melanie Shelley, and founded his final band, the alternative country band The Raphaels, a duo of Adamson and Nashville songwriter Marcus Hummon.

Adamson was a keen motorcyclist who regularly purchased new machines for riding around Fife. His interest extended to the race track where he sponsored the career of the British Championship rider Iain Duffus in the late 1980s.

Death
On 26 November 2001, Adamson was reported missing by his wife Melanie. At the time the couple had been estranged for several weeks, and Melanie filed for divorce on the day he had disappeared. He had been due to face drunk-driving charges in March 2002, and had been ordered to attend Alcoholics Anonymous (AA). He had previously experienced problems related to alcoholism, and had begun drinking again after having been sober for over a decade. On 16 December 2001 he was found dead in a room that he had booked into in the Best Western Plaza Hotel in Honolulu in Hawaii. According to a local police report he had died by hanging himself with an electrical cord from a pole in a wardrobe. A subsequent Coroner's Office report found that he had consumed a 'very strong' amount of alcohol around the time of his death.

His body was flown back to Scotland, where after a private funeral service at Dunfermline Crematorium in Fife, he was cremated. In the evening of 27 December 2001 a public memorial service was held to celebrate his life and career at Carnegie Hall, Dunfermline, attended by Richard Jobson and a crowd of several hundred mourners, including Adamson's family and friends, and former members of Big Country. Messages of condolence were publicly read out, including one from U2's The Edge, stating that Adamson with Big Country had written the songs that he wished U2 could write.

Memorials
In April 2009, a mural of Stuart Adamson was unveiled at East End Park, the home of Dunfermline Athletic Football Club of whom Adamson was a fan: the mural was painted by art students from the local Queen Anne High and Dunfermline High Schools, and adorns the wall of the north stand.

In September 2011 a commemorative bench to Stuart Adamson was unveiled at Pittencrieff Park in Dunfermline. It was paid for by fans and is inscribed with some of his lyrics chosen by fans in an online poll.

Stuart Adamson was the inspiration behind the song "3 Ways To See Despair" by Manic Street Preachers.

A housing development in Crossgates, opened in 2021, is named "Stuart Adamson Crescent".

Equipment
According to Skids bassist Bill Simpson, Adamson's first real guitar was a Gibson Flying V. He is usually associated with the Yamaha SG2000 guitar, which he used extensively during the Skids years, as well as on the first two Big Country albums. He also used Fender Stratocasters in this period to achieve lighter tones. Around the time of The Seer, Adamson began to lay his SG2000s aside and experimented with other models. Among these were several Les Pauls, a Gretsch Duo-Jet, and a number of ESP Model 901 Stratalike with humbucking pickups (in distinctive yellow and red colours). Adamson also had several guitars made for him by the Glasgow guitar-maker Jimmy Moon.

Big Country's distinctive 'Scottish' sound was created using an MXR pitch transposer, which pushed the guitar notes up an octave and created a shrill, bagpipe-esque whine. This can be heard in the lead guitar passages in the song "In a Big Country". Adamson was also noted for his use of the E-Bow, a device that magnetically vibrates guitar strings and generates unique tones with infinite sustain. The e-bow is most prominent in the introductions to the songs "The Storm" and "Lost Patrol".

The Scottish flavour is also present due to Adamson (and other co-writers in the band) using an open ‘drone’ string when writing and playing songs. 

Adamson used Session 'Sessionette:75' amplifiers mainly for live performances and recordings.

During his time in Skids, Stuart used HH amplifiers.  In early Big Country he used Marshall but moved to Fender Showman twin amps, including two with silver eagles stencilled on the grilles (a reference to cover art of their third album, The Seer).  Later he moved to Mesa Boogie amps and often displayed a small Saltire badge on the corner.

Discography
Skids discography

Big Country Discography

The Raphaels Discography

See also
List of solved missing person cases

References

External links
 The Skids Official Website

1958 births
2001 deaths
People from Dunfermline
Scottish new wave musicians
Scottish rock guitarists
Scottish male guitarists
Male new wave singers
Scottish punk rock guitarists
Big Country members
Skids (band) members
Alternative rock singers
Suicides by hanging in Hawaii
Scottish rock musicians
People educated at Beath High School
20th-century British male singers
20th-century British guitarists
2001 suicides